Robert "Nobby" Clark (born 12 April 1950) is a Scottish former professional footballer who played for Partick Thistle and then served Queen of the South as both player and manager.

Playing career
With Partick Thistle, Clark scored a single goal in a 1–1 draw against Rangers. He played in the club's 1972 UEFA Cup campaign. He was inducted into the club's 'Hall of Fame' in 2009 for his part in the 1971 Scottish League Cup Final-winning campaign, when all players who contributed to that victory were recognised. In total Clark played 154 games for Partick Thistle (including Scottish Football League, Scottish Cup, League Cup, Glasgow Cup and UEFA Cup fixtures).

As a defensive cornerstone from 1975 until 1984, Clark made 276 league appearances and scored six goals for Queen of the South, (340 first team appearances in all, placing him fourteenth in ranking of games played in their history). Jimmy Robertson was later interviewed by the club, and named Clark as being one of the best players that he played alongside at Palmerston Park.

Managerial and coaching career
Clark went on to be the manager of Queen of the South when he stopped playing at the end of the 1983-84 season for two years. It was during this time that he signed Tommy Bryce for the Dumfries club. Clark is the only person to gain promotion with Queens as a player and then go on to repeat the feat as manager.

Clark left to manage Stranraer at the start of the 1986-87 season. He was in charge at Stair Park until November 1987, when he was replaced as manager by "Sanny" McAnespie.

In 2001 Clark, joined Motherwell as a youth coach and first team opposition scout. He served managers Eric Black, Terry Butcher, Maurice Malpas, Mark McGhee and Jim Gannon before leaving to join up with McGhee at Aberdeen in 2009, and continued to work at the club carrying out first team opposition reports for managers Craig Brown and Derek McInnes over the next decade.

References

1950 births
Queen of the South F.C. players
Partick Thistle F.C. players
Queen of the South F.C. managers
Stranraer F.C. managers
Living people
Association football defenders
Association football coaches
Association football scouts
Aberdeen F.C. non-playing staff
Motherwell F.C. non-playing staff
Scottish footballers
Footballers from Glasgow
People educated at Hyndland Secondary School
Scottish football managers
Scottish Football League players
Scottish Football League managers